Jackal of Nahueltoro is a 1969 Chilean drama film directed by Miguel Littín, based on the true story of Jorge Valenzuela Torres, a poor farmer who, during a drunken rampage in 1960, murdered his partner and five of her children. 

It was entered into the 20th Berlin International Film Festival, winning the OCIC prize. It is considered by some to the best Chilean film of all time because it questions the morality of the death penalty and the social hypocrisy of trying to rehabilitate a man only to later execute him.

Plot
Jorge del Carmen Valenzuela Torres is a farmer who suffers from abuse and exploitation from childhood, leading to alcoholism. As an adult, he receives help from a poor woman named Rosa Rivas, who has five children from a previous marriage. Eventually, he marries her. However, in August 1960, while under the influence of alcohol, he gets into a fight with her and ends up murdering her and all of her children. He is arrested the following month and spends 32 months in prison, during which he learns to read and write and converts to Catholicism. He is ultimately sentenced to execution by firing squad, which is carried out in 1963.

Cast
 Nelson Villagra as Jorge Valenzuela
 Shenda Román as Rosa Rivas
 Héctor Noguera as Chaplain
 Luis Alarcón as the Judge
 Rafael Benavente as a prison guard
 Roberto Navarrete
 Marcelo Romo as Reporter
 Rubén Sotoconil as Corporal Campos
 Pedro Villagra

References

External links

1969 films
1969 drama films
Chilean black-and-white films
Chilean drama films
1960s Spanish-language films
Films directed by Miguel Littín